The Assam women's football team is an Indian women's football team representing Assam in the Senior Women's National Football Championship. Their best performance at the Senior Women's National Football Championship was the semi-finals and the third place playoff winning appearance at the 2000–01 edition held at Gurusar Sadhar in Punjab. They reached the quarter-finals at the 2021–22 edition.

Honours
 Senior Women's National Football Championship
 Third-place (1): 2000–01

References

Football in Assam
Women's football teams in India